Transcription factor 3 (E2A immunoglobulin enhancer-binding factors E12/E47), also known as TCF3, is a protein that in humans is encoded by the TCF3 gene. TCF3 has been shown to directly enhance Hes1 (a well-known target of Notch signaling) expression.

Function 

This gene encodes a member of the E protein (class I) family of helix-loop-helix transcription factors. The 9aaTAD transactivation domains of E proteins and MLL are very similar and both bind to the KIX domain of general transcriptional mediator CBP.  E proteins activate transcription by binding to regulatory E-box sequences on target genes as heterodimers or homodimers, and are inhibited by heterodimerization with inhibitor of DNA-binding (class IV) helix-loop-helix proteins. E proteins play a critical role in lymphopoiesis, and the encoded protein is required for B and T lymphocyte development.

This gene regulates many developmental patterning processes such as lymphocyte and central nervous system (CNS) development. E proteins are involved in the development of lymphocytes. They initiate transcription by binding to regulatory E-box sequences on target genes.

Clinical significance 

Deletion of this gene or diminished activity of the encoded protein may play a role in lymphoid malignancies. This gene is also involved in several chromosomal translocations that are associated with lymphoid malignancies including pre-B-cell acute lymphoblastic leukemia (t(1;19), with PBX1 and t(17;19), with HLF), childhood leukemia (t(19;19), with TFPT) and acute leukemia (t(12;19), with ZNF384).

Interactions 

TCF3 has been shown to interact with:

 CBFA2T3, 
 CREBBP, 
 ELK3, 
 EP300, 
 ID3, 
 LDB1, 
 LMX1A, 
 LYL1, 
 MAPKAPK3, 
 MyoD, 
 Myogenin, 
 PCAF, 
 TAL1 
 TWIST1,  and
 UBE2I.

References

Further reading 

 

Transcription factors